Fa Ziying (1 October 1964 – 28 December 1999) and Lao Rongzhi (born 25 December 1974) were a pair of Chinese serial killers born in Jiujiang, Jiangxi. The two met in 1993 and later became lovers. The prosecution accused them of kidnapping, robbery, and murder in Nanchang, Wenzhou, and Hefei from 1996 to 1999. A total of 7 people were killed. Fa was arrested on 23 July 1999 in Hefei and he was executed five months later. Lao fled in 1999 and was arrested in November 2019 in Xiamen. On 9 September 2021, she was sentenced to death by the Nanchang Intermediate People's Court for deliberate homicide, kidnapping, and robbery.

References

Fa Ziying
Lao Rongzhi
1996 murders in China
1997 murders in China
1998 murders in China
1999 murders in China
Fa Ziying
Fa Ziying
Chinese people convicted of murder
Chinese serial killers
Criminal duos
Executed Chinese serial killers
Chinese female serial killers
Lao Rongzhi
People convicted of kidnapping
People convicted of murder by China
People convicted of robbery
People from Jiujiang
People executed by China by firing squad